Numbers of Sri Lankan internally displaced persons displaced from the Vanni region since October 2008 and detained by the Sri Lankan Military at various camps in northern and eastern Sri Lanka during August and September 2009:

1. Andiyapuliyankulam School camp was closed in early September 2009 and IDPs moved to Menik Farm Zone 6.
2. Ariviththodam Sivanantha Vidyalayam camp was closed in early September 2009 and IDPs moved to Menik Farm Zone 6.
3. Cheddikulam Maha Vidyalayam camp was closed in early September 2009 and IDPs moved to Menik Farm Zone 6.
4. Sooduventhapualvu Muslim School camp was closed in early September 2009 and IDPs moved to Menik Farm Zone 6.
5. Nelukkulam Kalaimahal Maha Vidyalayam camp was closed in early September 2009 and IDPs moved to Menik Farm Zone 6.

References

Refugee camps in Sri Lanka
IDP 2009-08
IDP 2009-08